Revolution X is a shooting gallery video game developed by Midway and released in arcades in 1994. The  gameplay is similar to Midway's earlier Terminator 2: Judgment Day, but is themed around the band Aerosmith. The oppressive New Order Nation regime and their leader Helga have abducted Aerosmith, and players use a mounted gun to control onscreen crosshairs and shoot enemies. The members of Aerosmith are hidden throughout the game's international locales and must be found in order to receive the game's true ending.

The arcade game was a critical and commercial success, but all of the ports were negatively received.

Plot 
In a dystopian version of 1996, an alliance of corrupt government and corporate military forces have taken control of the world in the guise of the "New Order Nation" (NON). The NON, with their vampish commander Head Mistress Helga (portrayed by Kerri Hoskins)), have declared war on youth culture (anyone aged from 13 to 30) and have banned all forms of music, television, magazines, and video games. The player travels to "Club X" in Los Angeles to see Aerosmith perform live, but the band is captured by NON troops and hustled off the stage in the middle of their show. After escaping from the club, the player steals a helicopter and flies across the city to find the band's car. From here, the player must destroy three NON installations in the Middle East, Amazon Jungle, and Pacific Rim, then travel to London to defeat Helga and her remaining forces at Wembley Stadium.

Gameplay
Revolution X is a rail shooter in which the players must shoot targets including NON soldiers and vehicles, with the ultimate goal of rescuing the band. Players start the game at Club X in Los Angeles, first fighting the NON troops inside and then stealing a helicopter to fly across the city and find Aerosmith's car. They must then destroy three NON facilities in the Amazon jungle, the Middle East and the Pacific Rim. These three stages may be played in any order; however, failing to complete the Middle East stage within a set time limit will send the players back to its start for another attempt. Finally, the players advance to Wembley Stadium for the final battle with the surviving NON forces and Head Mistress Helga. Throughout the game, objects can be shot that may reveal power-ups like health-replenishing shakes, CDs, powerful laserdiscs and Super Guns, Skull Bombs and shields. Players can also find hostages and free them throughout the game for extra points.

At the end of each stage, the players receive bonus points based on the number of enemies killed and hostages rescued, as well as the amount of damage done. The five members of Aerosmith are hidden in secret locations throughout the game. When found, each member presents the player with a set of Aerosmith wings that increase the end-of-stage bonus. All members must be found in order to unlock the best ending and bonus level, in which the players go backstage after blowing up Helga, and can collect high-value Mammy Awards, as well as party with the band.

Development and release
Mortal Kombat II features an advertisement with the old Revolution X logo that arcade operators could toggle on and off. Occasionally after a large in-game explosion, Steven Tyler can be heard saying "Toasty!" in a high-pitched voice in reference to an easter egg in  Mortal Kombat II. The game was originally developed as a title based on the film Jurassic Park. However, Sega acquired the rights instead and eventually released its own arcade game based on the film. Midway then retooled its concept to revolve around Aerosmith.

The first release labeled Proto 5.0 (5/23/1994) is lacking several speech samples spoken by members of Aerosmith which can be heard after collecting power-ups and has a shorter Pacific Rim level.  Revision 1.0 (6/16/1994) restored the missing speech samples and has the complete Pacific Rim level and completed two new crosshairs in P2 and P3. Revolution X was released as upright two player and deluxe three player arcade units and as a conversion kit for existing gun games such as Terminator 2: The Arcade Game.

Another Revolution X featuring the hip-hop group Public Enemy was considered, but reportedly scrapped after the negative reception that the home versions of the original Revolution X received.

Soundtrack 
The soundtrack consists of several Aerosmith songs continuously looped, including "Eat the Rich", "Sweet Emotion", "Toys in the Attic", and "Walk This Way". A Muzak version of "Love in an Elevator" plays in the elevator part of the Amazon Jungle level. The soundtrack was featured in the CD Offer after playing or during attract mode.

The console versions include loops of "Rag Doll" for the attract screen, main menu, and score, "Fever" for the Middle East level, and "Dude (Looks Like a Lady)" for the ending.

Ports
The game was later ported by Rage Software and Software Creations, and released by Acclaim for MS-DOS computers, the Super Nintendo Entertainment System, Mega Drive, PlayStation, and Sega Saturn. A 32X version was demonstrated at the 1995 Electronic Entertainment Expo, but was never released, and possibly never completed. An Atari Jaguar conversion was in development and slated to be published around the fourth quarter of 1995, but it was never released.

Reception

In North America, RePlay reported Revolution X to be the fifth most-popular upright arcade game at the time. Play Meter also listed the game to be the second most-popular arcade game at the time. GamePro gave the arcade version a rave review, praising the ability to choose from multiple paths, the numerous secret items, the sharp graphics, and the Aerosmith soundtrack. They concluded "Rev X is not a revolution in gun games, but it's definitely the best one yet." In a retrospective review, Allgame said it "can be quite a bit of fun", citing the tongue-in-cheek silliness and the ability to choose one's path at certain junctures.

The home versions of the game, however, were thoroughly condemned by critics. The four reviewers of Electronic Gaming Monthly highly praised the digitized voices and music of the SNES version, with two of them going so far as to say they were the best they'd heard on any 16-bit console, but nonetheless concluded it to be an inexcusably poor conversion. They particularly noted the absence of many graphical details from the arcade version and the awkward, sluggish movement of the control cursor. GamePros The Axe Grinder also criticized the graphics and controls, remarking that "Moving your target sight is a breeze, but accurately pinpointing small targets is difficult." He disagreed with EGM on the audio, describing the music as dull and the sound effects as infrequent and muted. In the same issue, Air Hendrix found the same targeting problems in the Genesis version, and said it "desperately needs" light gun support. He also found the graphics to be grainy and choppy and the sounds to be static-ridden. Reviewers for Next Generation ridiculed the "laughable graphics, indistinguishable digitized voices, and awful music", and added that the game is overly repetitive and simply not fun.

Scary Larry of GamePro panned the PlayStation version. Citing prominent slowdown, mediocre graphics, and a bland soundtrack, he assessed that "With standard shooting that doesn't live up to its arcade counterpart, Rev X seems like an old game wheezing through on its past reputation". Next Generation commented, "This shooter ... was popular in the arcades, but this conversion is abysmal." IGN gave the PlayStation version a 1 out of 10. They complained of slow controls and poor graphics and concluded that "Revolution X isn't the worst game ever made, but it sure comes close."

Echoing Scary Larry's assessment of the PlayStation version, GamePros Bruised Lee commented that "Acclaim took Midway's smash arcade hit and turned it into a complete miss for the Saturn." He complained of blocky graphics, dull backgrounds, repetitive gameplay, extreme slowdown, and poor sound effects. Sega Saturn Magazine summarized it as "An incredibly bland and monotonous game matched only by the blandness and monotony of the band that endorse it", citing overlong boss fights and a lack of intelligent design to where the enemies appear.

Electronic Gaming Monthlys Seanbaby placed the Super NES version as number 10 in his "20 worst games of all time" feature.

Conversely, Spanish magazine Superjuegos gave the SNES version 91, regarding the scaling as one of the best in 16 bits, and the soundtrack as one of the best in the console. The magazine was also complimentary to the PlayStation and Sega Saturn versions, giving both a score of 92, regarding the scaling as the best seen on a console.

See also
 Journey (1983 video game)

References

External links
 Revolution X at arcade-history
 

1994 video games
Aerosmith
Arcade video games
Cancelled Atari Jaguar games
Cancelled Sega 32X games
DOS games
Video games based on musicians
PlayStation (console) games
Rail shooters
Sega Genesis games
Sega Saturn games
Super Nintendo Entertainment System games
Video games with digitized sprites
Band-centric video games
Video games scored by Chris Granner
Video games set in 1996
Alternate history video games
Dystopian video games
Video games developed in the United States
Rage Games games